Embraport, syllabic abbreviation of Empresa Brasileira de Terminais Portuários, is the largest multiple use private sector port terminal of Brasil. The port started operation in July 2013. the first stage of the port can handle 1.2 million TEU, with the second stage in operation it can handle 2 million TEU.

DP World and Brazil’s Odebrecht each own shares in the project through a joint venture called Coimex Investments Ports (CIP).

Embraport, is being erected near existing port facilities in Santos, in São Paulo (State). Santos is Brazil's largest container port, handling nearly 75 percent of the local trade and 25 percent of Brazil's foreign trade.

External links
DP World
Embraport Project

References

Container terminals
Ports and harbours of Brazil
2013 establishments in Brazil